Bolero is a fashion and lifestyle magazine based in Zürich, Switzerland. It has been in circulation since 1990 and published monthly.

History and profile
Bolero was established in 1990. The magazine is published by Ringier in German on a monthly basis.

Sithara Atasoy served as the editor-in-chief of Bolero. As of 2015 Sabina Hanselmann-Diethelm was the editor-in-chief of the magazine which had an edition for men, BoleroMen. BoleroMen ceased publication in 2018. In 2015 its sister magazine Edelweiss was merged into the magazine. Following the merge Bolero began to publish an additional French edition addressing women living in the French-speaking regions of Switzerland. This edition was based in Lausanne and was also published monthly. Its French edition folded in 2018.

In 2014 the circulation of Bolero was 33,111 copies.

References

External links
 Official website

1990 establishments in Switzerland
French-language magazines
German-language magazines
Lifestyle magazines
Magazines established in 1990
Mass media in Lausanne
Magazines published in Zürich
Monthly magazines published in Switzerland
Women's fashion magazines
Women's magazines published in Switzerland